Samantaray is a surname/title used by people belonging to the Khandayat caste, in Odisha. It's also used by Utkala Brahmins and Karanas.

Notable People
Biplab Samantray, is a cricketer.
Elina Samantray, is an actress.
Debasish Samantray, is a cricketer.
Yudhistir Samantray, is a politician.

References 

Surnames